Erddy Ferdian Titaley (born August 23, 1987) is an Indonesian footballer that currently plays for Persidafon Dafonsoro in the Indonesia Super League.

References

External links

1987 births
Living people
Indonesian footballers
Persidafon Dafonsoro players
Association football midfielders
Sportspeople from Papua